The Central Collegiate Ski Association (CCSA) is an NCAA skiing-only conference.  As the NCAA does not have divisions in skiing, it is composed of NCAA Division I, Division II, and Division III schools, as well as one community college. Members are located in Michigan, Minnesota and Wisconsin. The conference is organized for Nordic skiing only.

Members

The following schools are CCSA members:

College of St. Scholastica
Gogebic Community College
Gustavus Adolphus College
Michigan Tech University
Northern Michigan University
St. Cloud State University (women only)
St. Olaf College
University of Wisconsin – Green Bay

Former Members
 University of Alaska Fairbanks Members from 1992 to 2015–16

External links

NCAA conferences
College skiing conferences in the United States